Ronnie Harris, Jr. (born June 3, 1992) is a professional gridiron football wide receiver for the Ottawa Redblacks of the Canadian Football League (CFL). He attended the University of New Hampshire where he played for the New Hampshire Wildcats from 2010 to 2014.

Professional career

National Football League
After going un-drafted in the 2015 NFL Draft he signed with the New Orleans Saints of the National Football League (NFL), but was released before the 2015 season began and joined the team's practice roster. After being released from the Saints' practice roster in October 2015, he was signed by the Atlanta Falcons in December to their practice roster where he remained for the 2015 season. During the following off-season, he re-signed with the Saints for the 2016 season, but was again released following the pre-season games.

Canadian Football League
Harris signed with the Toronto Argonauts on February 1, 2017. He was released following mini camp on May 1, 2017, but was then signed by the BC Lions on May 23, 2017. He played in two pre-season games with the Lions, recording two catches for 47 yards and one touchdown, but was released on June 17, 2017 as part of final training camp cuts. Shortly after, he was signed by the Winnipeg Blue Bombers on June 21, 2017 to their practice roster, but was released again on June 30, 2017. Harris was then signed by the Ottawa Redblacks on July 11, 2017 and spent the season on the practice roster and suspended list.

During the 2018 season, Harris was promoted to the active roster for the Redblacks and played in his first professional football game on July 6, 2018 where he had one catch for 10 yards. He scored his first touchdown on a 14-yard reception from Trevor Harris against the Montreal Alouettes on August 11, 2018. He finished the year having played in 16 regular season games recording 49 receptions for 697 yards and two touchdowns. In 2019, he solidified himself as a starter with the Redblacks and played in 14 regular season games while catching 62 passes for 774 receiving yards and two touchdowns. As a pending free agent in 2020, Harris re-signed with the Redblacks on February 5, 2020 to a one-year contract. After the 2020 CFL season was cancelled, he signed another contract extension with the Redblacks on January 15, 2021. Harris continued to be one of the Redblacks' best receivers during the 2021 season, playing in all 14 regular season games and catching 46 passes for 595 yards. Following the season Harris and Ottawa agreed to a one-year contract extension. Harris was released on February 14, 2023.

Personal life
Harris was born in Würzburg, Germany to Ronnie Sr. and Annette Harris, former members of the military, but grew up in Odenton, Maryland.

References

External links
 Ottawa Redblacks bio
 New Hampshire bio
 New Orleans Saints bio

1992 births
Living people
American football wide receivers
American players of Canadian football
Atlanta Falcons players
BC Lions players
Canadian football wide receivers
German players of American football
New Hampshire Wildcats football players
New Orleans Saints players
Ottawa Redblacks players
People from Odenton, Maryland
Players of American football from Maryland
Toronto Argonauts players
Winnipeg Blue Bombers players
Sportspeople from Würzburg